The Eighth Goa Assembly (term : 2022-present) is the unicameral legislature of the state of Goa in western India. It consists of 40 members. It is in-charge of the budget, the Assembly appropriates money for social programs, agricultural development, infrastructure development, etc. It is also responsible for proposing and levying taxes.

The Assembly meets in the Goa State Legislative Assembly Complex in Porvorim, Bardez.

History

Elections 
 

In July 2022, the ruling BJP's MLA Joshua D'Souza was elected for the post of the Deputy Speaker of the Goa Legislative Assembly, with 25 votes.

Defections
On 14 September 2022, 8 Congress MLAs switched party and joined BJP after a successful Operation Kamala. Former Chief Minister of Goa Michael Lobo, along with 7 other Congress MLAs joined Bharatiya Janata Party, after meeting Dr. Pramod Sawant, Chief Minister of Goa from BJP.

Composition

March 2022 - September 2022

September 2022 - to present

Members of Legislative Assembly 
:

References

External links 
Goa Legislature official site

 

8
Goa
Goa MLAs 2022–2027